The Good Company was a Canadian variety television series which aired on CBC Television as mid-season programming from 1968 to 1969.

Premise
The Good Company was a group of 25 performers between the ages of 16 and 25, originally appearing on a special broadcast for Juliette. The television series was of a variety format that featured 20 of the 25 Good Company members. Norman Amadio served as the series musical director.

Scheduling
This half-hour series was broadcast on Mondays at 9:00 p.m. (Eastern) from 17 June to 12 September 1968 in its first season, and from 30 June to 8 September 1969 in the final season.

References

External links
 

CBC Television original programming
1968 Canadian television series debuts
1969 Canadian television series endings
1960s Canadian variety television series